Kamm, Kamp  is a German or Jewish surname, from the German word for "comb", most likely a metonymic occupational surname for a comb maker, or a wool comber.

Kamm is also an alternative form of the surname Kam, Kahm, Cam, Cahm  (קם), from Middle High German kâm "mould".

Notable people with the surname include:
Wunibald Kamm (1893–1966), automotive engineer, known for the Kamm tail
Willie Kamm (1900–1988), baseball player
Antony Kamm (1931–2011), English publisher and writer.
Frances Kamm (b. c. 1948), American philosopher
William Kamm (b. 1950), leader of a Catholic sect
John Kamm, American businessman and human rights activist
Oliver Kamm (b. 1963) British writer
Kris Kamm (b. 1964), American actor
John Kamm (entrepreneur) (b. 1971)
Anat Kamm (b. 1987), Israeli journalist involved in the Anat Kamm–Uri Blau affair

See also

Roter Kamm crater

References

Jewish surnames
German-language surnames